Michele Dunaway (born in 1965) is an American author of romantic novels.  She is a member of the Romance Writers of America and sold her first book because of an editor appointment at a national convention.

Dunaway is the elder of two siblings, in St. Louis, Missouri. 
She began writing as a young child, but didn't seriously attempt publication until 1999, when she met with an editor. The editor requested her work, and then bought it less than two months later. She has been published for over 15 years and also writes for the VisualThesaurus.com website.

USA Today reviewer Becky Condit recommended her 2014 book, A Little Christmas Jingle, as "a very sweet Christmas season story" with "a roller coaster of emotions and family interference."

Dunaway attended Kirkwood High School and Webster University, and many of her works feature St. Louis locations.
She is also a high school teacher, and the Missouri Interscholastic Press Association named her its 2012 High School Journalism Teacher of the Year.

Bibliography
Date First Published, Title, Contents Notes (if any), Series Connection (if any), Book/s Number in Series (if any), Original Publisher
2000, A Little Office Romance, none, Harlequin American Romance
2001, Taming the Tabloid Heiress, none, Harlequin American Romance
2002, The Simply Scandalous Princess, The Carradignes: American Royalty, Harlequin American Romance
2002, Catching the Corporate Playboy (a Jacobsen book), none, Harlequin American Romance
2003, Sweeping the Bride Away, none, Harlequin American Romance
2003, The Playboy's Protegee, (A Jacobsen book), none, Harlequin American Romance
2004, Unwrapping Mr. Wright, none, Harlequin American Romance
2004, About Last Night, (A Jacobsen book), none, Harlequin American Romance
2005, Emergency Engagement, none, Harlequin American Romance
2006, Legally Tender, none, Harlequin American Romance
2006, Capturing the Cop, (A Jacobsen book), Harlequin American Romance
2006, The Marriage Campaign, American Beauties, Harlequin American Romance
2006, The Wedding Secret, American Beauties, Harlequin American Romance
2007, Nine Months' Notice, American Beauties, Harlequin American Romance
2007, Hart's Victory, NASCAR, Harlequin
2008, Tailspin, NASCAR, Harlequin
2008, Out of Line, NASCAR, Harlequin
 The Christmas Date, Harlequin American Romance
 The Marriage Recipe, Harlequin American Romance
 Twins for the Teacher, Harlequin American Romance
 Bachelor CEO, Harlequin American Romance
2010, Baby in the Boardroom, Harlequin American Romance
2010, The Doctor's Little Miracle, Harlequin American Romance
2014, A Little Christmas Jingle, Man of the Month, St. Martin's Press
2015, Burning for You, Man of the Month, St. Martin's Press
2015, Fan the Flames, Man of the Month, St. Martin's Press
self published: The Greek Billionaire's Secret Baby and The Billionaire's Bought Bride
2016 Man of the Month: A Calendar Romance Series e-book bunble, St. Martin's Press

References

External links
Official website

1965 births
20th-century American novelists
American romantic fiction writers
Living people
Writers from St. Louis
21st-century American novelists
American women novelists
Women romantic fiction writers
20th-century American women writers
21st-century American women writers
Webster University alumni
Novelists from Missouri
Schoolteachers from Missouri
American women educators